Maxine Chernoff (born 1952) is an American novelist, writer, poet, academic and literary magazine editor.

Biography
She was born and raised in Chicago, Illinois, and attended the University of Illinois at Chicago.

Chernoff is a professor and Chair of the Creative Writing program at San Francisco State University. With her husband, Paul Hoover, she edits the long-running literary journal New American Writing. She is the author of six books of fiction and ten books of poetry, including The Turning (2008) and Among the Names (2005), both from Apogee Press.

Chernoff's novel American Heaven and her book of short stories, Some of Her Friends That Year, were finalists for the Bay Area Book Reviewers Award. With Paul Hoover, she has translated The Selected Poems of Friedrich Hölderlin (Omnidawn Press, 2008) which won the 2009 PEN Translation Prize.

As of 2013, she lives in Mill Valley, California.

Works

Novels
  A Boy in Winter (Crown Publishing, 1999; Harper Flamingo Australia, 2000)
  American Heaven (Coffee House Press, 1996), a finalist for the Bay Area Book
Reviewers Award
  Plain Grief (Summit, 1991; available as e-book from Previewport.com, 2001)

Short stories
  Some of Her Friends That Year: New & Selected Stories (Coffee House Press, 2002), a finalist for the Bay Area Book Reviewers Award
  Signs of Devotion: (stories) (Simon & Schuster, 1993) a New York Times Book Review Notable Book for 1993.
  Bop, stories (Coffee House Press, 1986; Vintage Contemporaries, 1987)

Poetry
 Camera (Subito Press, 2017)
 Here (Counterpath Press, 2014)
 Without (Shearsman, England, 2012)
 A House in Summer (Argotist Press, England, 2012)
 To Be Read in the Dark  (Omnidawn, 2011)
 The Turning (Apogee Press, 2008)
  Among the Names (Apogee Press, 2005)
  Evolution of the Bridge: Selected Prose Poems (Salt Publications, 2005)
  World: Poems 1991–2001 (Salt Publications, 2001)
 Leap Year Day: New & Selected Poems (Another Chicago Press, 1990; Jensen Daniels, 1999)
 Japan (Avenue B Press, 1988)
 New Faces of 1952 (Ithaca House, 1985)
   Utopia TV Store (The Yellow Press, 1979)
  A Vegetable Emergency, prose poems (Beyond Baroque Foundation, 1976)
The Last Aurochs (Now Press, 1976)

Editor
Selected Poems of Friedrich Hölderlin, co-translated with Paul Hoover; (Omnidawn, 2008)
New American Writing (with Paul Hoover), (1986) — present)

Awards
1985 Carl Sandburg Award
1985 PEN New Books Award
1986 Friends of American Writers' Award
1986 LSU Southern Review Fiction Award
1993 Sun-Times Fiction Prize
1988 CCLM Editors' Award
2002 Marin Arts Council Fellowship
1996 and 2002 BABRA finalist
2009 PEN Translation Award
5 Illinois Arts Council Fellowships
 2013 NEA Poetry Fellowship

References

Sources

External links
Maxine Chernoff Faculty profile page at San Francisco State University
Apogee Press – Authors
Maxine Chernoff Online Works
Poem by Maxine Chernoff at Melancholia's Tremulous Dreadlocks
New American Writing: Web site
"Add-Verse" a poetry-photo-video project Chernoff participated in

1952 births
Living people
American women short story writers
20th-century American novelists
Modernist women writers
Writers from Chicago
Writers from California
University of Illinois Chicago alumni
American women poets
American women novelists
20th-century American women writers
20th-century American poets
Jewish poets
20th-century American short story writers
Novelists from Illinois